Washington County is a county located in the U.S. state of Illinois. As of the 2010 census, it had a population of 14,716. Its county seat is Nashville. It is located in the southern portion of Illinois known locally as "Little Egypt".

History
Washington County was formed on January 2, 1818, out of St. Clair County. It was named for George Washington. Despite its relative proximity to the Illinois suburbs of St. Louis, Missouri, the county is not considered part of the St. Louis metropolitan area, also known as the Metro-East. In 1813, the Lively Massacre occurred near Little Crooked Creek. In 1959, the state established the Washington County State Recreation Area.  Washington County was initially settled by immigrants from Kentucky who moved northward out of that state in the early 1800s.  In the late 1800s there were (relatively) large numbers of immigrants who settled in Washington County, and by the early 1900s there were large numbers of first-generation immigrants still living in Washington County.  They primarily came from the four countries of Germany, Poland, Ireland and England.

Geography
There are many lakes, rivers, streams, and creeks in this area, including the Kaskaskia River, which is the county's northern border.

Climate and weather

On November 17, 2013, an EF4 tornado swept through the area, destroying homes and causing two fatalities.

Major highways

  Interstate 64
  U.S. Highway 51
  Illinois Route 4
  Illinois Route 13
  Illinois Route 15
  Illinois Route 127
  Illinois Route 153
  Illinois Route 177
  Illinois Route 160

Adjacent counties
 Clinton County (north)
 Marion County (northeast)
 Jefferson County (east)
 Perry County (south)
 Randolph County (southwest)
 St. Clair County (west)

Demographics

As of the 2010 United States Census, there were 14,716 people, 5,926 households, and 4,112 families residing in the county. The racial makeup of the county was 97.7% white, 0.7% black or African American, 0.3% Asian, 0.1% American Indian, 0.4% from other races, and 0.8% from two or more races. Those of Hispanic or Latino origin made up 1.3% of the population. In terms of ancestry, 53.6% were German, 14.0% were Polish, 13.1% were Irish, 7.7% were English, and 6.1% were American.

Of the 5,926 households, 30.1% had children under the age of 18 living with them, 57.6% were married couples living together, 7.3% had a female householder with no husband present, 30.6% were non-families, and 25.9% of all households were made up of individuals. The average household size was 2.44 and the average family size was 2.93. The median age was 42.3 years.

The median income for a household in the county was $51,440 and the median income for a family was $64,171. Males had a median income of $44,272 versus $30,683 for females. The per capita income for the county was $24,846. About 5.5% of families and 9.1% of the population were below the poverty line, including 13.2% of those under age 18 and 8.9% of those age 65 or over.

Education
The county is served by six school districts:
 Oakdale CCSD 1
 West Washington County CUD 10
 Irvington CCSD 11
 Ashley CCSD 15
 Nashville CCSD 49
 Nashville Community High School District 99

Communities

Cities
 Ashley
 Centralia
 Nashville

Villages

 Addieville
 Du Bois
 Hoyleton
 Irvington
 New Minden
 Oakdale
 Okawville
 Radom
 Richview
 Venedy

Unincorporated communities
 Beaucoup
 Clarmin
 Cordes
 Elkton
 Huegely
 Lively Grove
 Plum Hill
 Posen
 Pyramid
 Stone Church

Townships
Washington County is divided into these townships:

 Ashley
 Beaucoup
 Bolo
 Covington
 DuBois
 Hoyleton
 Irvington
 Johannisburg
 Lively Grove
 Nashville
 Oakdale
 Okawville
 Pilot Knob
 Plum Hill
 Richview
 Venedy

Politics
Washington is a rural conservative county in Southern Illinois that has always trended Republican in  presidential elections. The only Democrat to win a majority of the county's ballots since the Civil War was Franklin D. Roosevelt in his 1932 landslide. Historically, the county was dominated by organized labor and family farms. The area tends to be economically and socially conservative.

Media 
WNSV in Nashville is the only radio station in the county.

The two weekly newspapers in the county are The Nashville News, located in Nashville, and The Okawville Times, which is based in Okawville.

See also 
 Lively massacre
 National Register of Historic Places listings in Washington County

References
Specific

General

External links
 

 
1818 establishments in Illinois Territory
Illinois counties
Southern Illinois
Populated places established in 1818
Pre-statehood history of Illinois